Kevin Rolland (born 10 August 1989) is a French freestyle skier. He won the gold medal at the 2009 FIS Freestyle World Ski Championships in the halfpipe. He lost his title in 2011 to the Canadian Mike Riddle but still finished on the podium at the second place.

Rolland has also won seven medals at the Winter X Games and two medals at the Winter X Games Europe, including back-to-back golds in the SuperPipe at both events. Rolland also became the overall Winter Dew Tour Superpipe Champion in 2011.

During the development of the open world extreme sports video game Steep, several professional skiers, including Kevin Rolland and extreme sports athletes and experts were consulted by the developing team.

Although hospitalised by a fall in 2019 which left him with head trauma, multiple contusions to his liver, kidneys, and lungs, and fractured his ribs and pelvis, Rolland made a comeback at the 2022 Winter Olympics in Beijing.

References

External links
 
 
 
 
 

1989 births
Living people
French male freestyle skiers
X Games athletes
Superpipe skiers
Freestyle skiers at the 2014 Winter Olympics
Freestyle skiers at the 2018 Winter Olympics
Freestyle skiers at the 2022 Winter Olympics
Olympic freestyle skiers of France
Medalists at the 2014 Winter Olympics
Olympic bronze medalists for France
Olympic medalists in freestyle skiing
People from Bourg-Saint-Maurice
Sportspeople from Savoie